"Process" is a 2019 album by the techno group LSD, a collective composed of producers Luke Slater, Steve Bicknell, and Dave Sumner (aka Function).

The songs are described as "melodic and mind-melting techno with surreal atmospheres and propulsive drum-programming", and directly follow from their highly regarded 2017 EP "Process".

Track listing
All tracks written and produced by Slater, Bicknell and Sumner.
 
 Process 4
 Process 5 
 Process 6 
 Process 7 
 Process 8 
 Process 9

Notes

External links
 Process 7 on soundcloud

2019 albums
Luke Slater albums